State Route 58 (SR 58), also locally called "Highway 58", is a north–south state highway in the U.S. state of Tennessee that serves as a major route for many communities in Roane, Meigs, and Hamilton counties.

The section of SR 58 in Chattanooga between SR 153 and Riverside Drive, connecting with SR 319, is known as "Amnicola Highway". The main campus of Chattanooga State Community College is commonly known as the Amnicola campus due to its location on Amnicola Highway.

SR 58 joins I-40 for part of its route in Roane County, from the Kingston exit (352) east to the Oak Ridge exit (356) west of Oak Ridge.

Route description

Hamilton County

SR 58 begins as a secondary highway, known as Ochs Highway, in Hamilton County at the Georgia state line in Lookout Mountain, where the road continues as SR 157. It goes north through Lookout Mountain before leaving the scenic town at an intersection and becoming concurrent with SR 17 and entering Chattanooga. In a largely unsigned segment, it then enters downtown via Tennessee Ave, W 40th St, Alton Park Blvd, and Market Street. Along Market St it has an interchange with I-24/US 27 before turning west at W 20th St for a short concurrency with US 64/US 11/SR 2. It continues as Riverfront Parkway, eventually intersecting with SR 316 and turning east, passing under the P. R. Olgiati Bridge. SR 58 then travels along the banks of the Tennessee River at the northern edge of downtown before leaving, interchanging and becoming concurrent with SR 319. It then comes to an interchange with the SR 153 freeway, where SR 58 becomes concurrent with it and SR 319 ends, just south of the Chickamauga Dam. SR 58 becomes a primary highway and follows SR 153 south for a short distance until the interchange with SR 17, where they separate and SR 58 continues east, paralleling Chickamauga Lake/Tennessee River once again. SR 58 then goes east and leaves Chattanooga, entering Harrison. It goes straight through Harrison before turning north and crossing Chickamauga Lake, leaving Harrison. SR 58 then intersects and has a short concurrency with SR 312 in the community of Snow Hill, just west of Ooltewah. It continues north to Georgetown, where it has an intersection with SR 60 before crossing into Meigs County.

Meigs County

In Meigs County, it has an intersection with SR 306 before crossing the Hiwassee River. SR 58 then continues north through the flat fertile farmland of Meigs County before entering Decatur and intersecting SR 30. SR 58 then goes through downtown to intersect SR 304 before going through a small business and residential district before leaving Decatur, continuing north. It continues through farmland to Ten Mile, where it intersects with SR 68. It continues north through Ten Mile, and enters Roane County.

Roane County

It continues through rural southeast Roane county to an intersection with SR 72 just west of Midway. It continues north and has another intersection with SR 304 before crossing Watts Bar Lake and entering Kingston, immediately passing by Fort Southwest Point. It then runs along the shores of the lake before entering downtown and junctioning with US 70/SR 1. It then continues through downtown to have an interchange and become concurrent with I-40. SR 58 then follows I-40 east for 4-miles, between exits 352 and 356. At exit 356, SR 58 breaks off and continues north, intersecting SR 326 at the same interchange. SR 58 continues north and crosses over the Clinch River to enter Oak Ridge, immediately passing by the K-25 nuclear weapons facility. It then has an intersection with SR 327 before ending at a trumpet interchange with SR 95, just a few miles outside of Oak Ridge's main business district.

Major intersections

References

External links
 Video of demolition of old SR 58 bridge over the Tennessee River near Kingston

058
058
058
058
058